Hyssuridae is a family of crustaceans belonging to the order Isopoda.

Genera:
 Belura Poore & Lew Ton, 1988
 Galziniella Müller, 1991
 Hyssura Norman & Stebbing, 1886
 Kupellonura Barnard, 1925
 Neohyssura Amar, 1953
 Xenanthura Barnard, 1925

References

Isopoda